Gowravaram is a village in NTR district of the Indian state of Andhra Pradesh. It is located in Jaggayyapeta mandal of Vijayawada revenue division.In the Route of NH65  It is one of the villages in the mandal to be a part of Andhra Pradesh Capital Region.

References

Villages in NTR district